Haldia is an industrial port city in Purba Medinipur district in the Indian state of West Bengal. The Haldia Township is bordered by the Haldi River, an offshoot of the Ganges River. Haldia is a centre for many petrochemical businesses, and is being developed as a major trade port for Kolkata.

Geography

Location

Demographics
 census, Haldia had a population of 200,762, out of which 104,852 were males and 95,910 were females. The 0–6 years population was 21,122. Effective literacy rate for the 7+ population was 89.06 per cent.

 India census, Haldia had a population of 170,695. Males constitute 53% of the population and females 47%. In Haldia, 13% of the population is under 6 years of age.

Administration

The city of Haldia is governed by the Haldia Municipality. Earlier Haldia Municipality had 26 wards. In 2015, the number of wards was increased to 29.

Haldia Municipality falls under the jurisdiction of two police territories, served by Haldia and Bhabanipur police stations.

Haldia is also a base of the Indian Coast Guard. Indian coast guard DHQ 8 (Headquarters for West Bengal) is located at Haldia. There is a hoverport to house four of the eighteen hovercraft belonging to the Indian Coast Guard. The Indian coast guard also has a pontoon jetty to berth a fleet of ships. Presently two fast patrol vessels, one inshore patrol vessels, and one small craft are based at Haldia.

Climate
Summers can be very hot and humid. Usual summer temperatures in May, the hottest month, range from a low of  degrees to highs around  degrees. Although summers are hot and humid, Kalbaishakhis provide a relief to the people, albeit killing some in the process.

Transportation

Road-way

Haldia is connected to Kolkata by bus of South Bengal State Transport Corporation . Recent efforts have seen introduction of new air-conditioned buses which take less than three hours from station to station.. Haldia is also connected to Bankura, Kharagpur, Tarakeswar, Burdwan, Asansol by bus.

Rail-way
Haldia railway station is the major railway station connecting the city to Kolkata, Chennai and Delhi. For long-distance trains, except one or two weekly for Delhi and Chennai, you have to go to either Mecheda, Kolkata or Kharagpur.

Water-way
A catamaran service used to operate from Kolkata to Haldia, but was withdrawn due to its high price and unpopularity among tourists. A governmental ferry service operates between Haldia and Nandigram.

Industry

Haldia has several major factories, including South Asian Petrochemicals Ltd, Indian Oil Corporation Limited (IOCL), Haldia Energy Limited, Exide, Shaw Wallace, Tata Chemicals, Haldia Petrochemicals, India Power Corporation Ltd., Hindustan Lever, MCPI Private Limited(formerly Mitsubishi Chemical Corporations India), S.J.Constructions and LTC&Co. The only leading logistical company in town is Jay Road Carriers which provides affordable logistics across India.

Education

Haldia Government Sponsored X-Class Secondary School (H.S.)

Sports

The Indian Football Association and Tata Football Academy have been operating for years in the city to scout and promote football talents. A new project called Haldia International Sports City is also under construction.

Cricket is a popular sport in Haldia with multiple coaching clubs and local facilities available for the youth and teenagers to train, and compete at local and regional level cricket tournaments. Haldia also has multiple football coaching clubs. The city has a few public and private wooden floor badminton courts and swimming pools- people come from various places to have their coaching in these arenas.

Japanese community
Haldia once had a small, thriving Japanese community. The Japanese community of Haldia were mostly engineers and top executives at the Mitsubishi Chemical Corporation purified terephthalic acid(the corporation's majority stake is now under The Chatterjee Group) plant in the city. The community had lived in the mini Japanese township called Sataku (Japantown) for many years. Sataku had Japanese restaurant and a local Japanese news station. Japanese movies were shown in local theatres present in the township. Haldia was the only Indian city to have a Japantown.

References

External links
 

 
Port cities in India
Cities and towns in Purba Medinipur district
Cities in West Bengal